Claude Saurel (born 17 April 1948) is a former French rugby union footballer and current coach. He is a former head coach of the Russia national rugby team.

Saurel played his rugby for Béziers, his position being flanker. He went on to become the national coach of Morocco. He made the move to Georgia after he was invited to conduct an audit of Georgian rugby in 1997.

He went on to work with their Rugby Sevens team, until he was appointed as the national head coach in the summer of 1999. His appointment as head coach saw a surge in success for Georgian rugby. During the European Nations Cup tournament of 2000, Georgia finished second in the competition, finishing only behind Romania, who were against them only on match points difference.

The following year, Georgia improved upon their impressive performance at the European Nations in 2000, they won all five of their matches during the 2001 tournament, and thus finishing at the top of the table. Georgia placed second in the 2001-2002 tournament, but they would go on to qualify for the Rugby World Cup for the first time ever. They were grouped into pool C alongside giants - South Africa and England. Although they were comprehensively defeated by England in their opening game as well as Samoa, they performed well against the Springboks and Uruguay.

Since 2007, he is the coach of the Russian national team. Saurel's first match in charge was against his former team (Georgia won 31-12).

References

External links
Georgia Profile

1948 births
Sportspeople from Béziers
French rugby union players
French rugby union coaches
Living people
Rugby union flankers
AS Béziers Hérault players
Georgia national rugby union team coaches
Russia national rugby union team coaches
French expatriate sportspeople in Russia
French expatriate sportspeople in Georgia (country)